The Line of Contact marked the farthest advance of American, British, French, and Soviet armies into German controlled territory at the end of World War II in Europe. In general a "line of contact" refers to the demarcation between two or more given armies, whether they are allied or belligerent.

This contact began with the first meeting between Soviet and American forces at Torgau, near the Elbe river on Elbe Day, April 25, 1945. The line continued to form as American, British, French and Soviet forces took control of, or defeated, Nazi forces, up until the time of the May 8 unconditional surrender of Germany and beyond. This line of contact did not conform to the agreed-upon occupation zones, as stipulated in the Yalta Conference. Rather, it was simply the place where the two armies met each other. The Western Allies had actually gone far beyond the Yalta agreement boundaries, in some cases up to two hundred miles past, going deep into the states of Mecklenburg, Saxony-Anhalt, Saxony, as well as Brandenburg. The capital of Mecklenburg, the city of Schwerin, was captured on May 2, 1945.
The city of Leipzig, in Saxony, was probably the largest of the cities captured by the Americans that were inside the areas to be later passed to the Soviets. The land of Thuringia was completely occupied by American forces.

The complete line of contact between Western Allies forces and Soviet forces began at Wismar on the Baltic coast and proceeded south, passing along Schwerin; Magdeburg, taken over by the Soviet from the British in July 1st, 1945, after the end of the war in Europe and the Stör Canal, where Soviet and American forces met in May 4th, 1945; Dessau and Pratau, contact being made at 26 April, 1945 ;an area east of Leipzig, Leipzig being taken over by the Soviets from the Americans in July 3rd, 1945, after the end of the war in Europe; and on to the Czech town of Pilsen; and towards Linz, where Soviet and American armies meet in Austria. New Zealand units and Yugoslavian partisans made contact in Trieste in 3nd May, 1945 

US forces generally held onto these gains within Germany until July 1945, when under orders from President Harry S. Truman – and against the advice of British Prime Minister Winston Churchill – the US forces withdrew to the Yalta agreement boundaries dividing Germany into occupation zones. The Soviet Union may not have allowed American, British and French forces into Berlin, which was completely under their control, if the U.S. had not honored the Yalta agreement boundaries. The German areas relinquished by American troops became part of the Soviet-dominated East Germany.

The US Army did not withdraw from western Czechoslovakia until December 1945, as part of an agreement removing all American and Soviet troops from the country. US, British, French and Soviet controlled territory in Austria was incorporated into an occupation plan. Austria remained technically an occupied country by the Four Powers until 1955, when all foreign troops departed. Austria became a neutral country outside of the Iron Curtain, whereas Czechoslovakia fell inside the Iron Curtain and thus allied with the Soviet Union through the Warsaw Pact.

References

External links
 CBC Archives CBC Radio reports on the Russian and American meeting at Torgau on May 1, 1945.

World War II occupied territories
Aftermath of World War II
Allied occupation of Germany
Borders
Soviet Union–United States relations